The 2005 Melbourne Thunderstorm was a severe weather event that occurred between 2 February and 3 February 2005 which produced 120 mm (or about 4.7 inches) of rain in Melbourne, the highest total since records began. Every suburb in Melbourne, parts of eastern Victoria and the Geelong/Bellarine Peninsula were affected by the storm.

See also
 Extreme weather events in Melbourne

References

2005 Melbourne
2005 in Australia
2005 meteorology
2000s in Melbourne